"You Better Wait" is a song by American singer-songwriter Steve Perry from his second solo studio album, For the Love of Strange Medicine (1994). The ballad was released as the first single from the album on June 28, 1994. The song peaked at number 29 on the US Billboard Hot 100 and reached number one in Canada on the week of September 19, 1994.

Music video
The music video was filmed in late August 1994 in the Grand Canyon area.

Track listings
US CD single
 "You Better Wait" (long version) – 4:52
 "Forever Right or Wrong (Love's Like a River)" – 4:29
 "If You Need Me, Call Me" – 5:49
 "One More Time" – 3:30
 "You Better Wait" (single version) – 3:34

US cassette single
 "You Better Wait" (single edit)
 "Stand Up (Before It's Too Late)"

European maxi-CD single
 "You Better Wait" (radio edit) – 3:34
 "You Better Wait" (LP version) – 4:52
 "Stand Up (Before It's Too Late)" – 4:49

Charts

Weekly charts

Year-end charts

Release history

References

1994 singles
1994 songs
Columbia Records singles
RPM Top Singles number-one singles
Songs written by Steve Perry
Steve Perry (musician) songs